Gonokhovo is a rural locality (a selo) and the administrative center of Gonokhovsky Selsoviet, Kamensky District, Altai Krai, Russia. The population was 731 as of 2013. There are 10 streets.

Geography 
Gonokhovo is located 28 km southeast of Kamen-na-Obi (the district's administrative centre) by road. Myski is the nearest rural locality.

References 

Rural localities in Kamensky District, Altai Krai